This is a list of the consorts of the four main Byzantine Greek successor states of the Byzantine Empire following the Fourth Crusade in 1204 and up to their conquest by the Ottoman Empire in the middle of the 15th century. These states were Nicaea, Trebizond, Epirus, and the Morea. The last two never actually claimed the imperial title, except briefly under Theodore Komnenos Doukas in the late 1220s, who began as ruler of Epirus but crowned himself emperor in Thessalonica.

Empress of Nicaea

Empress of Trebizond 

The consorts of rulers of Trebizond, like their counterparts in the other two Byzantine successor states, the Empire of Nicaea and the Despotate of Epirus, initially claimed the traditional Byzantine title of Empress consort the Romans. However, after reaching an agreement with the restored Byzantine Empire in 1282, the official title of the consorts of Trebizond was changed to Empress consort of the entire East, of the Iberians and the Perateia and remained such until the Empire's end in 1461. The state is sometimes called the Komnenian or Megalokomnenian empire from its ruling dynasty.  Trebizond had three reigning empresses, Theodora of Trebizond (1284–1285), Irene Palaiologina (1340–1341), and Anna of Trebizond (1341–1342).

Consorts in Epirus

Consorts in the Morea

See also 
 List of Roman and Byzantine empresses
 List of Holy Roman empresses
 List of Russian royal consorts
 List of Latin empresses
 List of Greek royal consorts

Notes

Byzantine, exiled
Emp